Hugo Becerra Monterrey (born September 18, 1996) is a Mexican race car driver.

Career 
Becerra began his racing career in karting at age of 12 (2009). He remained in karting until 2011 when he migrated to endurance racing competing in Turismos de Resistencia  or "Touring Endurance Championship" in 2011 and 2012 with a Mini Challenge car, he participated in GT Racing in the Porsche GT3 Cup Mexico in 2013 and later on competed in open-wheel racing, in Formula Ford, Formula Panam, Panam F3 and FIA F4 NACAM Championship.

Racing record 
Career Summary

References

http://www.carrerasenvivo.com/site/noticias/30-varios/2579-hugo-becerra-jr-va-por-las-24-horas

http://pasion-deportiva-mexico.blogspot.mx/2012/08/segundo-lugar-para-hugo-becerra-jr-en.html
http://pasionporlavelocidad.com/site/automovilismo/hugo-becerra-buscara-una-victoria-mas-en-los-turismos-de-resistencia/
http://www.endurancechallenge.com/app/n/i/1046
http://www.tuningmex.com/noticias/ahora-el-mundo-del-automovilismo-esta-lleno-de-adrenalina-joven-hugo-becerra-monterrey/
http://www.notiauto.com/app/n/i/1224
https://mx.linkedin.com/in/hugo-becerra-monterrey-327431b1
http://pasionporlavelocidad.com/site/automovilismo/tehuacan-fue-el-escenario-del-primer-test-de-cuatro-pilotos-del-panam-gp-series/
https://www.driverdb.com/championships/standings/formula-4-nacam/2016/
https://infopits.mx/2016/02/18/hugo-becerra-y-la-seguridad-en-los-fia-formula-4/
http://www.elnorte.com/aplicacioneslibre/articulo/default.aspx?id=713455&md5=e895c99b936db101c0d6a59369b363a2&ta=0dfdbac11765226904c16cb9ad1b2efe
http://deportes.terra.com.mx/automovilismo/alfonso-toledano-presenta-la-nueva-f3panam-powered-by-abarth,db33cebed4dd4410VgnVCM20000099cceb0aRCRD.html

Living people
1996 births
Mexican racing drivers
21st-century Mexican people

NACAM F4 Championship drivers